The 2012 US Open was a tennis tournament played on the outdoor hard courts at the USTA Billie Jean King National Tennis Center in Flushing Meadows Park, of Queens, New York City, United States. It was played from August 27 to September 10. As a result of adverse weather conditions on September 8, which included a full evacuation of the National Tennis Center because of an upcoming tornado, another day was added to the schedule for the fifth straight year, with the women's final postponed to the afternoon of Sunday, September 9 rather than the previous evening, the men's semi-final between Novak Djokovic and David Ferrer suspended on September 8 and completed on September 9, and the men's final postponed to the afternoon of Monday, September 10.

Djokovic and Samantha Stosur were the defending men's and women's singles champions, respectively. Both were unsuccessful in their title defences; Stosur being narrowly defeated by World No. 1 Victoria Azarenka in the quarter-finals, and Djokovic defeated in the final by Andy Murray. Murray became the first British man since Fred Perry in 1936 to win a Grand Slam singles title, and the first man to win both the US Open and the Olympic men's singles gold medal in the same year. In the women's draw, Serena Williams won her fourth US Open title, and first since 2008, by defeating Victoria Azarenka in the final.

Notable events

 2010 champion and 2011 finalist Rafael Nadal withdrew from the tournament because of a knee injury.
2010 finalist Vera Zvonareva also withdrew from the tournament due to illness.
Two former World No. 1s and US Open champions ended their careers after this year's US Open. Three-time women's champion Kim Clijsters suffered her first defeat at Flushing Meadows since losing the 2003 final to her compatriot and rival Justine Henin, when she was defeated in the second round by Laura Robson. This loss marked the end of Clijsters' singles career. American Andy Roddick, who won in 2003, retired from professional tennis with his loss against 2009 champion Juan Martín del Potro in the fourth round.
 Robson followed up her upset of Clijsters with a third round victory against Li Na, making the fourth round of a Grand Slam tournament for the first time, and this was also the first British woman to reach the fourth round in any Grand Slam since Samantha Smith did so in 1998 Wimbledon.
On September 3, John Isner and Philipp Kohlschreiber finished play at 2:26 am, tying the 1993 Mats Wilander/Mikael Pernfors record for the latest-ever finish to a matchday at the tournament.
 Serena Williams won 23 consecutive games from 4–4 in the first set against Ekaterina Makarova in the third round through to 3–0 in the first set against Ana Ivanovic in the quarter-finals.
After 17 consecutive Grand Slam tournaments without a quarter-final appearance, Ivanovic reached that stage for the first time since winning the 2008 French Open.
Ivanovic, Marion Bartoli and Roberta Vinci all advanced to the US Open quarter-finals for the first time. For Vinci, this was her first Grand Slam quarter-final, eleven years and 31 Grand Slam tournaments after debuting at the 2001 US Open.
 Maria Sharapova returned to the semi-finals for the first time since 2006, and Sara Errani advanced to her first ever US Open semi-final.
 Serena Williams advanced to her second straight US Open final, and her sixth overall. She defeated Victoria Azarenka in the first three-set final to be decided since 1995.
In the men's draw, Tomáš Berdych advanced to his first US Open quarter-final by virtue of his three-set win against Nicolás Almagro in the fourth round. He then advanced to the semi-finals after upsetting five-time US Open champion Roger Federer in the quarter-finals.
With Federer's defeat, this meant that for the first time since the 2004 French Open, neither Federer nor Nadal featured in a Grand Slam semi-final.
 With their victory in the men's doubles final, Bob and Mike Bryan took sole possession of the Open-era record for most Grand Slam men's doubles titles. Their 12th Grand Slam title took them past The Woodies (Todd Woodbridge and Mark Woodforde). The win was also their fourth at the US Open, tying the Open-era record of Bob Lutz and Stan Smith.
The women's final between Victoria Azarenka and Serena Williams was postponed to Sunday, due to inclement weather, for the fourth time in five years.
The second men's semi-final between David Ferrer and Novak Djokovic was also postponed to Sunday, also due to inclement weather, with the men's final to be played on Monday for the fifth year in a row.
 Andy Murray became the first British winner of a Grand Slam singles title since 1977, and the first British man to do so since 1936, by defeating the defending champion Djokovic in the final. Lasting 4:54, it was the equal-longest US Open final by duration in history, and the equal-second longest Grand Slam final in the Open Era, only behind the 2012 Australian Open final.
For the first time since 2003, the four Grand Slam Men's Singles titles were won by different players.

Points and prize money

Point distribution
Below is a series of tables for each of the competitions showing the ranking points on offer for each event.

Seniors points

Junior points

Prize money

* per team

Bonus prize money

Singles players

Men's singles

Women's singles

Day-by-day summaries

Events

Seniors

Men's singles

 Andy Murray defeated  Novak Djokovic, 7–6(12–10), 7–5, 2–6, 3–6, 6–2
• It was Murray's 1st career Grand Slam singles title.

Women's singles

 Serena Williams defeated  Victoria Azarenka, 6–2, 2–6, 7–5
• It was Williams' 15th career Grand Slam singles title and her 4th at the US Open.

Men's doubles

 Bob Bryan /  Mike Bryan defeated  Leander Paes /  Radek Štěpánek, 6–3, 6–4
• It was Bob and Mike's 12th career Grand Slam doubles title and their 4th at the US Open.

Women's doubles

 Sara Errani /  Roberta Vinci defeated  Andrea Hlaváčková /  Lucie Hradecká, 6–4, 6–2
• It was Errani's 2nd career Grand Slam doubles title and her 1st at the US Open.
• It was Vinci's 2nd career Grand Slam doubles title and her 1st at the US Open.

Mixed doubles

 Ekaterina Makarova /  Bruno Soares defeated  Květa Peschke /  Marcin Matkowski, 6–7(8–10), 6–1, [12–10]
• It was Makarova's 1st career Grand Slam mixed doubles title.
• It was Soares' 1st career Grand Slam mixed doubles title.

Juniors

Boys' singles

 Filip Peliwo defeated  Liam Broady, 6–2, 2–6, 7–5

Girls' singles

 Samantha Crawford defeated  Anett Kontaveit, 7–5, 6–3

Boys' doubles

 Kyle Edmund /  Frederico Ferreira Silva defeated  Nick Kyrgios /  Jordan Thompson, 5–7, 6–4, [10–6]

Girls' doubles

 Gabrielle Andrews /  Taylor Townsend defeated  Belinda Bencic /  Petra Uberalová, 6–3, 6–4

Wheelchair events
This year there was no wheelchair competitions due to a conflict with the Paralympic Games in London. Wheelchair competitions would return in 2013.

Singles seeds 
The following are the seeded players and notable players who withdrew from the event. Seedings based on ATP and WTA rankings are as of August 20, 2012. Rankings and points as before August 27, 2012.

Men's singles 

The following player would have been seeded, but he withdrew from the event.

Women's singles 
 

The following players would have been seeded, but they withdrew from the event.

Wild card entries
Below are the lists of the wild card awardees entering in the main draws.

Men's singles wild card entries
  James Blake
  Robby Ginepri
  Lleyton Hewitt
  Steve Johnson
  Denis Kudla
  Dennis Novikov
  Guillaume Rufin
  Jack Sock

Women's singles wild card entries
  Mallory Burdette
  Julia Cohen
  Victoria Duval
  Nicole Gibbs
  Bethanie Mattek-Sands
  Kristina Mladenovic
  Melanie Oudin
  Olivia Rogowska

Men's doubles wild card entries
  Chase Buchanan /  Bradley Klahn
  Christian Harrison /  Ryan Harrison
  Steve Johnson /  Jack Sock
  Jürgen Melzer /  Philipp Petzschner
  Nicholas Monroe /  Donald Young
  Dennis Novikov /  Michael Redlicki
  Bobby Reynolds /  Michael Russell

Women's' doubles wild card entries
  Mallory Burdette /  Nicole Gibbs
  Kim Clijsters /  Kirsten Flipkens
  Samantha Crawford /  Allie Kiick
  Irina Falconi /  Maria Sanchez
  Madison Keys /  Jessica Pegula
  Grace Min /  Melanie Oudin
  Serena Williams /  Venus Williams

Mixed doubles wild card entries
  Samantha Crawford /  Mitchell Krueger
  Irina Falconi /  Steve Johnson
  Varvara Lepchenko /  Donald Young
  Nicole Melichar /  Brian Battistone
  Grace Min /  Bradley Klahn
  Melanie Oudin /  Jack Sock
  Sloane Stephens /  Rajeev Ram

Qualifiers entries

Men's singles

  Igor Sijsling
  Hiroki Moriya
  Tim Smyczek
  Guido Pella
  Karol Beck
  Grega Žemlja
  Rhyne Williams
  Maxime Authom
  Bradley Klahn
  Guido Andreozzi
  Matthias Bachinger
  Bobby Reynolds
  Jimmy Wang
  Ricardo Mello
  Daniel Brands
  Teymuraz Gabashvili
The following players received entry from a lucky loser spot:
  Florent Serra

Women's singles

  Magdaléna Rybáriková
  Tatjana Malek
  Nastassja Burnett
  Samantha Crawford
  Anastasia Rodionova
  Lesia Tsurenko
  Edina Gallovits-Hall
  Johanna Konta
  Kirsten Flipkens
  Julia Glushko
  Lara Arruabarrena
  Elina Svitolina
  Olga Puchkova
  Alla Kudryavtseva
  Stefanie Vögele
  Kristýna Plíšková
The following players received entry from a lucky loser spot:
  Eleni Daniilidou

Protected ranking
The following players were accepted directly into the main draw using a protected ranking:

 Men's Singles
  Somdev Devvarman (PR 85)
  Paul-Henri Mathieu (PR 96)
  Tommy Robredo (PR 50)

 Women's Singles
  Timea Bacsinszky (PR 47) 
  Ágnes Szávay (PR 44)

Withdrawals
The following players were accepted directly into the main tournament, but withdrew with injuries or personal reasons.

Men's Singles
Before the tournament
 Juan Ignacio Chela → replaced by  Adrian Ungur
 Juan Carlos Ferrero → replaced by  Olivier Rochus
 Gaël Monfils → replaced by  Benjamin Becker
 Rafael Nadal → replaced by  Rajeev Ram
 David Nalbandian → replaced by  Florent Serra

During the tournament
 Mardy Fish

Women's Singles
Before the tournament
 Elena Baltacha → replaced by  Gréta Arn
 Petra Cetkovská → replaced by  Eleni Daniilidou
 Kaia Kanepi → replaced by  Garbiñe Muguruza
 Svetlana Kuznetsova → replaced by  Sesil Karatantcheva
 Flavia Pennetta → replaced by  Johanna Larsson
 Vera Zvonareva → replaced by  Casey Dellacqua

References

External links

 Official website of US Open

 
 

 
US Open
US Open
US Open
US Open
2012
US Open
US Open
US Open